Accusonus, Inc is a Greek technology company that develops software for music production/performance and audio repair. Accusonus was founded in 2013 in Patras, Greece and is now based in Patras, Greece and in Lexington, Massachusetts (USA). Accusonus develops both standalone software and audio plugins that can be used in digital audio workstation (DAW) programs and in Video editing software.

In February 2022, Meta acquired Accusonus for a figure reported to be between €70 and €100 million.

Products

Regroover 
Regroover is a virtual instrument plugin for sampling and beat making. Regroover uses Machine Learning to deconstruct or unmix audio loops into their component parts. These parts can be used in a range of applications for both production and remixing.

Drumatom 
Drumatom is a standalone software for removing microphone spill (audio) from drum recordings. Drumatom analyzes multi-channel drum recordings and allows the user to reduce or completely remove drum bleed from the close microphones.

ERA products 
ERA-D is an audio plugin that jointly removes noise and reverb from audio recordings. ERA-N is a noise removal plugin that allows the user to remove noise with a single knob. ERA-R is a reverb removal plugin that allows the user to remove reverb with a single knob.

References

External links
 Official website

Companies established in 2013